Adrian Quist and Don Turnbull defeated the defending champions Jack Crawford and Vivian McGrath 6–8, 6–2, 6–1, 3–6, 6–2, to win the men's doubles tennis title at the 1936 Australian Championships.

Seeds

  Jack Crawford /  Vivian McGrath (final)
  Adrian Quist /  Don Turnbull (champions)
  Harry Hopman /  Len Schwartz (semifinals)
  John Bromwich /  Arthur Huxley (quarterfinals)

Draw

Draw

Notes

References

External links
  Source for seedings and the draw

1936 in Australian tennis
Men's Doubles